The Trailhead Fire was a  wildfire burning in the Middle Fork American River canyon in both Placer County & El Dorado County, California.  the fire has consumed  and is 100% contained.

Events 

On Wednesday June 29, less than 24 hours after the fire was first reported, the fire had grown to over  forcing widespread evacuations as over 2,500 structures were threatened. By Wednesday evening, the fire was only 12% contained and two evacuation centers had been established: one at Golden Sierra High School in Garden Valley for residents in El Dorado County, and a second at the Gold Country Fairgrounds in Auburn for residents in Placer County.

See also
2016 California wildfires

References

External links
 California wildfires on the US Forestry Incident Information System  (InciWeb)

2016 California wildfires
Wildfires in Placer County, California
Wildfires in El Dorado County, California
June 2016 events in the United States